The Schweizer Cup (French: Cup Suisse) is an annual bonspiel, or curling tournament, held in Baden, Switzerland. It is organized by the Swiss Curling Association and is similar to the Canada Cup held in Canada each year. It was established in 2018. It was a World Curling Tour event in 2018 and 2019, but was dropped in 2020.

Past champions

Men

Women

Mixed doubles
The Schweizer Cup mixed doubles event is held separately on a different date at the Eissportzentrum Lerchenfeld in St. Gallen.

References

Curling competitions in Switzerland
Baden, Switzerland
National curling cups
Recurring sporting events established in 2018
2018 establishments in Switzerland
Annual sporting events in Switzerland
Former World Curling Tour events
Sport in St. Gallen (city)